Église fortifiée de Domfessel is a Lutheran church in Domfessel, Bas-Rhin, Alsace, France. Originally built in 1340, it became a registered Monument historique in 1877.

References

Domfessel
Domfessel
Domfessel
Domfessel